Arman Andreasyan is an Armenian freestyle wrestler. He is a bronze medalist at the European Wrestling Championships.

Career 

He won one of the bronze medals in the men's 70 kg event at the 2020 Individual Wrestling World Cup held in Belgrade, Serbia.

In 2021, he won one of the bronze medals in the men's 70 kg at the European Wrestling Championships held in Warsaw, Poland. Two weeks later, he failed to qualify for the 2020 Summer Olympics in Tokyo, Japan at the World Olympic Qualification Tournament held in Sofia, Bulgaria.

In October 2021, he lost his bronze medal match in the men's 70 kg event at the World Wrestling Championships held in Oslo, Norway. He competed in the men's 70kg event at the 2022 World Wrestling Championships held in Belgrade, Serbia.

Achievements

References

External links 
 

Living people
Year of birth missing (living people)
Place of birth missing (living people)
Armenian male sport wrestlers
European Wrestling Championships medalists
21st-century Armenian people